Qarabqolu (also Romanized as Qarābqolū; also known as Qarābgholū and Qarāblū) is a village in Bash Qaleh Rural District, in the Central District of Urmia County, West Azerbaijan Province, Iran. At the 2006 census, its population was 591, in 168 families.

References 

Populated places in Urmia County